John Melvin Craft (born March 24, 1947, in Laurel, Mississippi) is an American former triple jumper who placed 5th in the Men's triple jump at the 1972 Summer Olympics. He attended Eastern Illinois University and graduated in ‘69 and ‘74. Craft also served as assistant coach at Eastern until 2002.

References

1947 births
Living people
American male triple jumpers
Athletes (track and field) at the 1972 Summer Olympics
College track and field coaches in the United States
Eastern Illinois Panthers athletic directors
Eastern Illinois Panthers men's track and field athletes
Olympic track and field athletes of the United States
Pan American Games medalists in athletics (track and field)
Pan American Games bronze medalists for the United States
Athletes (track and field) at the 1971 Pan American Games
Medalists at the 1971 Pan American Games